Honduras competed at the 2004 Summer Paralympics in Athens, Greece. The team included two athletes, one man and one woman, neither of whom won a medal.

Sports

Athletics

Men's track

Women's track

See also
Honduras at the Paralympics
Honduras at the 2004 Summer Olympics

References 

Nations at the 2004 Summer Paralympics
2004
Summer Paralympics